Epeigeus is a Greek hero in the Iliad. He was a Myrmidon and son of Agacles, who, having killed his father, was obliged to flee from Budeion. He took refuge in the house of Peleus who sent him with Achilles to Troy, where he was killed by Hector.

A Trojan asteroid, 5259 Epeigeus, has been named after him.

References

Footnotes

Achaeans (Homer)
Myrmidons